DZBC-DTV (digital channel 30) is a television station in Metro Manila. It is owned by Byers Communications and operated by Solar Entertainment Corporation under a subchannel lease agreement. Its transmitter is located in Antipolo, Rizal.

The station is inactive as of January 2022.

History
Prior to its resurface, Byers was assigned on UHF 68 by the National Telecommunications Commission (NTC). In 1992, Byers launched Intervision on Channel 68 as a UHF pay television service. A year later, however, ceased its operations due to an intense competition with cable operators, particularly Sky Cable.

In 2018, the NTC granted Byers Communications a television license assigned on UHF 30 for pay television purposes. Solar Entertainment and Byers signed an agreement wherein Solar will operate multiple subchannels on UHF 30 via digital terrestrial transmission.

In 2018, Solar launched its commercial freemium digital TV service Easy TV. The service, however, ceased its operations on September 30, 2019.

As of August 2020, this station currently carries the Solar Learning channel, which rebroadcasts a live feed from the Department of Education's DepEd TV programming service.

Digital channels

UHF Channel 30 (569.143 MHz)

References

Television stations in Metro Manila